Kiondre Thomas (born February 7, 1998) is an American football cornerback for the Green Bay Packers of the National Football League (NFL). He played college football at Kansas State and was signed as an undrafted free agent by the Cleveland Browns after the 2021 NFL Draft.

College career
Thomas was ranked as a threestar recruit by 247Sports.com coming out of high school. He committed to Minnesota on November 12, 2015. After three seasons at Minnesota, Thomas decided to transfer from Minnesota on February 3, 2020. He committed to Kansas State shortly thereafter.

Professional career

Cleveland Browns
Thomas was signed as an undrafted free agent by the Cleveland Browns on May 3, 2021. Thomas was waived by the Browns with an injury designation on August 16, 2021 and placed on injured reserve. Thomas was waived from injured reserve with an injury settlement on August 20, 2021.

Los Angeles Chargers
On September 6, 2021, Thomas was signed to the Los Angeles Chargers practice squad.

Green Bay Packers
On January 26, 2022, Thomas signed a reserve/future contract with the Green Bay Packers. He was waived on August 30, 2022, and signed to the practice squad the next day. On October 1, 2022, Thomas was elevated to the active roster from the practice squad. He signed a reserve/future contract on January 10, 2023.

References

External links
Green Bay Packers bio
Minnesota Golden Gophers bio
Kansas State Wildcats bio

1998 births
Living people
Sportspeople from Fort Smith, Arkansas
Players of American football from Arkansas
American football cornerbacks
Cleveland Browns players
Los Angeles Chargers players
Green Bay Packers players
Minnesota Golden Gophers football players
Kansas State Wildcats football players